Mocis diffluens is a moth of the family Erebidae. It is found from Mexico south through Central America to South America as well as on the Antilles.

References

External links
Moths of Jamaica

diffluens
Moths of North America
Moths of South America
Moths of Central America
Moths described in 1852